This is a list of episodes for the television series The Rookies.

Series overview

Episodes

Pilot movie (1972)

Season 1 (1972–73)

Season 2 (1973–74)

Season 3 (1974–75)

Season 4 (1975–76)

References

External links
 
 

Rookies